Yvan Yann Erichot (born 25 March 1990) is a French professional footballer. He can play as either a centre back or a right back.

Career

Monaco and Clermont Foot loan
On 26 June 2010, Erichot signed his first professional contract after agreeing to a three-year deal with Monaco. The following month, he was loaned to Clermont. Erichot made his professional debut with Clermont on 13 August 2010 in a league match against Dijon. He appeared as a half-time substitute in a 2–2 draw.

Leyton Orient
On 1 July 2016, Erichot signed a two-year contract with English League Two side Leyton Orient, with the option of a further year.

ÍBV
In December 2017, Erichot signed a one-year-deal with Icelandic Úrvalsdeild side and reigning cup winners ÍBV.

References

External links
 
 
 

1990 births
Living people
People from Chambray-lès-Tours
French people of Ugandan descent
Association football central defenders
Association football fullbacks
French footballers
French expatriate footballers
Ligue 2 players
Primeira Liga players
Challenger Pro League players
English Football League players
Liga II players
Clermont Foot players
U.D. Leiria players
Sint-Truidense V.V. players
Leyton Orient F.C. players
Íþróttabandalag Vestmannaeyja players
CSM Reșița players
Expatriate footballers in Portugal
French expatriate sportspeople in Portugal
Expatriate footballers in Belgium
French expatriate sportspeople in Belgium
Expatriate footballers in Iceland
French expatriate sportspeople in Iceland
Expatriate footballers in Romania
French expatriate sportspeople in Romania
Sportspeople from Indre-et-Loire
Footballers from Centre-Val de Loire